Steve Harris (born 29 September 1954 in Basingstoke, died 4th October 2016) was an English novelist who was known for his work in the horror genre.

Works

Novels
Adventureland aka "The Eyes of the Beast" (1990)
Wulf (1991)
The Hoodoo Man" (1992)Angels (1993)Black Rock (1996)The Devil On May St (1997)Strakers Island (1998)

NovellaChallenging The Wulf (1997)

Short StoriesHarry's Black and Decker (1989)Maximum Visibility (1997)Escape from Doughnut City'' (1998)

References

1954 births
English horror writers
People from Basingstoke
2016 deaths